Aleksandar Donkov (born 27 February 1949) is a Bulgarian sprint canoer who competed in the early 1970s. He finished ninth in the K-2 1000 m event at the 1972 Summer Olympics in Munich.

References
Sports-reference.com profile

1949 births
Bulgarian male canoeists
Canoeists at the 1972 Summer Olympics
Living people
Olympic canoeists of Bulgaria